Wellemmedan may refer to:
the Wellemmedan people
the Wellemmedan language